Zalla Unión Club is a Spanish football team based in Zalla, in the autonomous community of Basque Country. Founded in 1925 it plays in Tercera División – Group 4, holding home games at Estadio Landaberri, with a capacity of 3,500 seats. 

Team colours are: blue and white shirt, black shorts and blue and white-hooped socks at home, entirely red away.

Season to season

2 seasons in Segunda División B
30 seasons in Tercera División

External links
Official website 
Futbolme team profile 

Football clubs in the Basque Country (autonomous community)
Association football clubs established in 1925
1925 establishments in Spain